Bulbophyllum fenestratum is a species of orchid that is endemic to Southeast Asia.

Bulbophyllum fenestratum was first formally described in 1907 by Johannes Jacobus Smith in the Bulletin du Département de l'Agriculture aux Indes Néerlandaises.

References

fenestratum